An AKM is an assault rifle designed by Soviet small arms designer Mikhail Kalashnikov in 1959.

AKM may also refer to:

 Abul Kalam Mohammad, a common compound male given name
 AKM Semiconductor, Inc., a semiconductor manufacturer headquartered in San Jose, California
 Alpha Kappa Mu, an American collegiate honor society
 Apogee kick motor, a rocket motor that is regularly employed on artificial satellites
 Atatürk Cultural Center, a cultural center in Istanbul
 , the Austrian copyright collection agency
 Vanguard of Red Youth, a radical Russian socialist youth group